The New South Wales Under-16's rugby league team, also known as New South Wales Under-16s or New South Wales U16, represents New South Wales in the sport of rugby league at an under-16 age level. Since 2008, the team has played an annual fixture against the Queensland Under-16s team as a curtain raiser to a State of Origin game. The team features players selected from New South Wales's premier under-16 rugby league competition, the Harold Matthews Cup and Andrew Johns Cup. They are administered by the New South Wales Rugby League.

History 
Prior to 2008, junior interstate matches were contested at under-17 and under-19 levels. In 2008, with the advent of the National Youth Competition, the age levels switched to an under-16 and under-18 format to keep in line with the NSWRL's existing S.G. Ball Cup and Harold Matthews Cup competitions and the QRL's Mal Meninga Cup and Cyril Connell Cup competitions, which would begin in 2009.

New South Wales saw success in the first under-16 Origin fixture in 2008. They recorded their first defeat a year later, losing 30-10 in 2009 at Etihad Stadium. From 2010 to 2013, New South Wales would win four games consecutively before losing both fixtures against Queensland in 2014 and 2015. Since 2015 New South Wales have won every under-16 Origin fixture, in 2016, 2017 and 2018.

Players 
Players selected for the New South Wales under-16 team are usually contracted with a National Rugby League (NRL) side and, until 2017, played in the Harold Matthews Cup. Occasionally players who are contracted to Queensland-based NRL sides, who play in the Cyril Connell Cup, are selected. Each pre-season the New South Wales Rugby League will select an under-16 squad featuring players in contention for the mid-season fixture.

Results

2008 
Played as a curtain raiser to Game I of the 2008 State of Origin series.

2009 
Played as a curtain raiser to Game I of the 2009 State of Origin series.

2010 
Played as a curtain raiser to Game III of the 2010 State of Origin series.

2011 
Played as a curtain raiser to Game I of the 2011 State of Origin series.

2012 
Played as a curtain raiser to Game I of the 2012 State of Origin series.

2013 
Played as a curtain raiser to Game I of the 2013 State of Origin series.

2014 
Played as a curtain raiser to Game I of the 2014 State of Origin series.

2015 
Played as a curtain raiser to Game I of the 2015 State of Origin series.

2016 
Played as a curtain raiser to Game I of the 2016 State of Origin series.

2017 
Played as a curtain raiser to Game III of the 2017 State of Origin series.

2018 
Played as a curtain raiser to the Round 18 Brisbane Broncos-Warriors game.

See also 

 New South Wales State team
 New South Wales Residents team
 New South Wales Women's team
 New South Wales Under-20 team
 New South Wales Under-18 team
 Harold Matthews Cup
 New South Wales Rugby League
 Country Rugby League

References 

Rugby league in New South Wales